Mad Dog, in comics, may refer to:

 Mad Dog (DC Comics), a DC Comics supervillain
 Mad Dog, a number of Marvel Comics characters:
 Mad Dog (Marvel Comics), a Marvel/Timely Comics supervillain
 Mad Dog Rassitano, a Marvel Comics character and fictional SWAT member
 Mad Dog #336, an alias used by Peter Parker
 Mad Dog #736, an alias used by Captain Zero
 Mad Dog #2020, an alias used by Brainstorm
 "Mad Dog" Martin, a character who appeared in Combat Kelly and his Deadly Dozen
 "Mad Dog", a Marvel comics title based on the fictional comic of the same name in the sitcom Bob.

See also
Mad Dog (disambiguation)

References

tl:The Mad Dog (komiks)